= Back Down =

Back Down may refer to:

- "Back Down", a song by 50 Cent from the album Get Rich or Die Tryin'
- "Back Down", a song by Sugababes from the album Change
